Lieutenant General Sir Mark William Poffley,  (born 1960) is a former senior British Army officer.

Military career
Poffley was commissioned into the Royal Army Ordnance Corps in 1985. After seeing action in the Gulf War and then in the Bosnian War, he served as Deputy Chief of Staff for 24 Airmobile Brigade and then as Staff Officer responsible for Plans and Doctrine in the Attack Helicopter Team. He became commanding officer of 13 Air Assault Support Regiment in 2001, and was deployed to Macedonia in August of that year and Afghanistan in 2002.

Poffley went on to be Colonel Army Plans in 2003 and commander 102nd Logistic Brigade in 2005, seeing active service in Iraq in that capacity. He went on to be Principal Staff Officer to the Chief of the Defence Staff in December 2006, Chief of Staff Land Forces in March 2009 and Assistant Chief of the Defence Staff (Resources and Plans) in November 2011: he was given the additional title of Master General of Logistics in June 2012. He went on to be Commander Force Development and Capability in February 2014 as well as the Deputy Chief of the General Staff in Spring 2015. After that he was appointed Deputy Chief of Defence Staff (Military Capability) at the Ministry of Defence in January 2016. In the 2018 Queen's Birthday Honours, he was appointed Knight Commander of the Order of the Bath (KCB).

References

 

|-

1960 births
Royal Army Ordnance Corps officers
Military personnel of the Bosnian War
British Army lieutenant generals
British Army personnel of the Gulf War
British Army personnel of the Iraq War
British Army personnel of the War in Afghanistan (2001–2021)
Knights Commander of the Order of the Bath
Living people
Officers of the Order of the British Empire
Recipients of the Commendation for Valuable Service